Paralysed Age are a German gothic rock and darkwave band, composed of Marco Neumann, Stefan Kirsch, and Michael Knust. Since 1998 the band consisted of Michael Knust and Andrea Knust.

Discography
 1992: Christened Child
 1993: Exile
 1994: Nocturne
 1994: Bloodsucker (EP)
 1999: Empire of the Vampire (compilation)
 2001: Into the Ice
 2006: Tragedia Nosferata
 2019: Intermezzo

References

German dark wave musical groups